Mason County is a county located in the U.S. state of Washington. As of the 2020 census, the population was 65,726. The county seat and only incorporated city is Shelton. The county was formed out of Thurston County on March 13, 1854. Originally named Sawamish County, it took its present name in 1864 in honor of Charles H. Mason, the first Secretary of Washington Territory.

Mason County comprises the Shelton, WA Micropolitan Statistical Area and is included in the Seattle-Tacoma, WA Combined Statistical Area.

Geography

Geographic features

Brown Cove
Case Inlet
Hammersley Inlet
Harstine Island
Hood Canal
Lake Cushman
Mason Lake
Olympic Mountains
Puget Sound
Squaxin Island
Totten Inlet

Oakland Bay

Major highways
 U.S. 101
 SR 3
 SR 108
 SR 106

Adjacent counties
Jefferson County – northwest
Kitsap County – northeast
Pierce County – east/southeast
Thurston County – southeast
Grays Harbor County – southwest

National protected areas
 Olympic National Forest (part)
 Olympic National Park (part)

Demographics

2000 census
As of the census of 2000, there were 49,405 people, 18,912 households, and 13,389 families living in the county.  The population density was 51 people per square mile (20/km2).  There were 25,515 housing units at an average density of 26 per square mile (10/km2).  The racial makeup of the county was 88.46% White, 1.19% Black or African American, 3.72% Native American, 1.05% Asian, 0.45% Pacific Islander, 2.10% from other races, and 3.03% from two or more races.  4.78% of the population were Hispanic or Latino of any race. 16.7% were of German, 9.9% Irish, 9.8% English, 8.6% United States or American and 6.8% Norwegian ancestry.

There were 18,912 households, out of which 28.90% had children under the age of 18 living with them, 56.90% were married couples living together, 9.20% had a female householder with no husband present, and 29.20% were non-families. 23.30% of all households were made up of individuals, and 9.90% had someone living alone who was 65 years of age or older.  The average household size was 2.49 and the average family size was 2.89.

In the county, the population was spread out, with 23.50% under the age of 18, 7.70% from 18 to 24, 26.50% from 25 to 44, 25.80% from 45 to 64, and 16.50% who were 65 years of age or older.  The median age was 40 years. For every 100 females there were 107.00 males.  For every 100 females age 18 and over, there were 107.30 males.

The median income for a household in the county was $39,586, and the median income for a family was $44,246. Males had a median income of $37,007 versus $25,817 for females. The per capita income for the county was $18,056.  About 8.80% of families and 12.20% of the population were below the poverty line, including 17.30% of those under age 18 and 4.90% of those age 65 or over.

2010 census
As of the 2010 census, there were 60,699 people, 23,832 households, and 16,057 families living in the county. The racial makeup of the county was 86.1% white, 3.7% American Indian, 1.2% Asian, 1.1% black or African American, 0.4% Pacific islander, 3.4% from other races, and 4.1% from two or more races. Those of Hispanic or Latino origin made up 8.0% of the population. In terms of ancestry, 19.7% were German, 13.8% were English, 13.5% were Irish, 6.7% were Norwegian, and 4.9% were American.

Of the 23,832 households, 27.0% had children under the age of 18 living with them, 52.5% were married couples living together, 9.5% had a female householder with no husband present, 32.6% were non-families, and 25.3% of all households were made up of individuals. The average household size was 2.45 and the average family size was 2.87. The median age was 44.4 years.

The median income for a household in the county was $48,104 and the median income for a family was $56,809. Males had a median income of $44,992 versus $33,982 for females. The per capita income for the county was $22,530. About 11.1% of families and 15.6% of the population were below the poverty line, including 21.0% of those under age 18 and 9.0% of those age 65 or over.

Communities

City
Shelton (county seat)

Census-designated places
Allyn-Grapeview
Belfair
Hoodsport
Kamilche
Skokomish
Union

Unincorporated communities

Eldon
Harstine Island
Lake Cushman
Lilliwaup
Matlock
Potlatch
Tahuya

Politics

Healthcare
Mason County has one hospital, Mason General Hospital, in Shelton, operated by Washington Public Hospital District No. 1.

See also
National Register of Historic Places listings in Mason County, Washington

References

External links

 Official Tourism Web Site for Mason County
 Mason county government
 Mason County profile by the Shelton-Mason County Journal
 Mason County Daily News

 
1854 establishments in Washington Territory
Populated places established in 1854
Western Washington